Warren Thomas Murdock (12 January 1944 – 17 November 2014) was a New Zealand cricketer, born in New Plymouth, Taranaki, who played for Central Districts cricket team from 1962 to 1975. He also played for New Zealand's under-23s – scoring 46 runs from one match at 23.00 – as well as Hawke Cup cricket for Taranaki, Manawatu and Wairarapa.

References

External links
 

1944 births
2014 deaths
Cricketers from New Plymouth
New Zealand cricketers
Central Districts cricketers